The Malaysia International Trade and Exhibition Centre, often abbreviated as MITEC, is the largest trade and exhibition centre of Malaysia located in the suburb of Segambut, Kuala Lumpur. It is situated right next to MATRADE Exhibition and Convention Centre (MECC) and Menara MITI. The centre has a gross floor area of 143,191 square meters (1.5 million square feet), sprawling over a 13.3-acre prime land and a total of 484,376 square meters of exhibit space with ceilings as high as 36 meters making indoor sporting events feasible.

MITEC also consists of the largest pillar-less exhibition hall in Malaysia. The centre is capable of hosting mega-exhibitions for over 100,000 visitors and conventions with the capacity of 20,000 as well as 28,300 visitors in banquet seating at a time during events. MITEC is poised to be the first exhibition and convention venue of choice in the Southeast Asia region. Nine events of the South East Asia Games were held at MITEC. The architecture takes inspiration from a Rubber Seed and Songket, a traditional Malay fabric.

MITEC is the first component and flagship of the KL Metropolis development project with a total gross development value (GDV) of approximately RM20 billion. The development is currently being handled by Naza TTDI as its master developer.

Facts 
 Total exhibition area: 52,000 m².

Facilities
11 Exhibition Halls
10 Meeting Rooms
10 break rooms 
3 media centres
2 Cafes
Ballroom
Lounge and suites
Outdoor Plaza
Parking bays for 1,400 vehicles

Major events at MITEC 
29th SEA Games, Kuala Lumpur 2017
Malaysia International Furniture Fair.
Metaltech.
ASEAN Super 8.
Global Drone Conference.
TCE Baby Expo
Mercedes-Benz's Urban Hunting Festival 2018
COVID-19 Vaccination Centre (PPV)
Mobile Legends: Bang Bang Southeast Asia Cup 2022
Kuala Lumpur International Motor Show (KLIMS)

Transportation 
The centre will be served by  Dutamas MRT Station on the MRT Circle Line in the future which would also cover the KL Metropolis district.

See also 

 List of convention and exhibition centers

References

External links

MITEC official website

2017 establishments in Malaysia
Convention centres in Kuala Lumpur